Intelsat 3R (formerly PAS-3R) is a communications satellite owned by Intelsat located at 43° West longitude, serving the Americas market.

Satellite description 
PAS-3R was constructed by Hughes Aircraft Corporation, based on the HS-601 satellite bus. Designed for an operational life of 15 years, the spacecraft was equipped with 20 C-band and 20 Ku-band transponders. Its two solar panels, which had a span of  generated 4.7 kW of power when the spacecraft first entered service, which was expected to drop to around 4.3 kW by the end of the vehicle's operational life.

Launch 
Arianespace launched PAS-3R, using an Ariane 4 launch vehicle, flight number V82, in the Ariane 44L H10-3 configuration. The launch took place from ELA-2 at the Centre Spatial Guyanais, at Kourou in French Guiana, on 12 January 1996, at 23:10:00 UTC.

Intelsat 3R 
Intelsat 3R, formerly PAS-3R, launched in January 1996, the satellite was operated by PanAmSat until it merged with Intelsat in 2006. The spacecraft was renamed, along with the rest of PanAmSat's fleet, on 1 February 2007.

Decommissioning 
Intelsat 3R was removed from geostationary orbit in August 2011, being placed into graveyard orbit.

References 

Communications satellites in geostationary orbit
Satellites using the BSS-601 bus
Satellite television
Spacecraft launched in 1996
Intelsat satellites